The 1976 VFL Grand Final was an Australian rules football game contested between the Hawthorn Football Club and North Melbourne Football Club at the Melbourne Cricket Ground on 25 September 1976. It was the 79th annual Grand Final of the Victorian Football League, staged to determine the premiers for the 1976 VFL season. The match, attended by 110,143 spectators, was won by Hawthorn by a margin of 30 points, marking that club's third premiership victory.

Background

This was North Melbourne's third successive Grand Final, and were the reigning premiers after having defeated Hawthorn in the 1975 VFL Grand Final.

At the conclusion of the regular home-and-away season, Hawthorn had finished second (behind Carlton) on the ladder with 16 wins and 6 losses. North Melbourne had finished third with 15 wins and 7 losses. During the season Hawthorn played North Melbourne in two home and away games, winning by 22 and 8 points respectively.

In the finals series leading up to the Grand Final, North Melbourne lost to Hawthorn by 20 points in the Qualifying Final before defeating Geelong by 33 points in the First Semi-Final. They then met Carlton in the Preliminary Final which they won by just one point to advance to the Grand Final. Hawthorn, after their win in the Qualifying Final, defeated Carlton by 17 points in the Second Semi-Final to advance to the Grand Final.

Both teams made six changes to their respective teams from the 1975 Grand Final.

Teams

Umpires 
The umpiring panel for the match, comprising two field umpires, two boundary umpires and two goal umpires is given below. This was the first VFL Grand final to feature two field umpires. 

Numbers in brackets represent the number of grand finals umpired, including 1976.

Match summary
The match was something of a psychological war, with both teams taking turns to trade blows. North Melbourne went into the match in a somewhat defensive frame of mind; captain Keith Greig was minding Hawthorn's dangerous rover Leigh Matthews, and similarly attacking minded players in Malcolm Blight and Steven Icke also found themselves playing in defence. Hawthorn took the initiative from the start, with Leigh Matthews kicking the first goal of the game after five minutes. Late in the first quarter, Matthews struck Greig on the forehead sending him to the ground, and was reported. Greig was knocked out again later in the match, yet in spite of these heavy blows still played well enough to be among North's best players on the day.

The second quarter was for the most part even as both sides went goal for goal, but Kelvin Matthews and captain Don Scott kicked vital goals to give Hawthorn a 19-point lead at half time. Had they kicked for goal more accurately - star forward John Hendrie especially culpable with one goal and six behinds - the Hawks could easily have opened a six-goal lead.

After 10 minutes in the third quarter Kangaroos coach Ron Barassi made the move of putting Brent Crosswell on for Peter Keenan, which immediately provided North Melbourne with a target. Hawthorn continued to have problems up forward, kicking one goal and six behinds for the quarter, and by three-quarter time the Kangaroos and managed to close the margin to just ten points.

However, in the final quarter the Hawks kept the Kangaroos goalless. Greig suffered another heavy blow from Matthews, while Peter Knights and David O'Halloran each took big marks for Hawthorn. The Hawks added three goals for the quarter and eventually ran out easy winners. It was the club's third win under coach John Kennedy.

Epilogue
Hawthorn's win was dedicated to former captain Peter Crimmins who was dying from cancer. Before the game, Crimmins sent a telegram which Kennedy read to the team: "Good luck to you and all the boys. It will be a long, hard, 100 minutes but I am sure you will be there at the end. Regards, Peter Crimmins."  Kennedy implored his players to "Do it for the little fella", and later stated that he believed his team was never going to lose. The night of the Grand Final some players took the premiership cup to Crimmins' house to let him share in the celebrations. A press photographer accompanied them and a famous photo was published in the newspapers showing a wasted, reclining, yet beaming Crimmins holding the premiership cup surrounded by his jubilant teammates. The victory became popularly known as 'Crimmo's Cup' in recognition of the inspiration Crimmins provided to his team. Crimmins died just three days after the game, aged 28.

This was Kennedy's last game as Hawthorn coach. He was subsequently appointed coach of North Melbourne in 1985 and in his five seasons there he coached the club to the finals twice.

Hawthorn's next appearance in a Grand Final would be two years later (again against North Melbourne), in the 1978 VFL Grand Final, while North's next appearance would be against Collingwood in the 1977 VFL Grand Final.

Match Scorecard and Details

References

Bibliography
  
 Ross, J. (ed), 100 Years of Australian Football 1897-1996: The Complete Story of the AFL, All the Big Stories, All the Great Pictures, All the Champions, Every AFL Season Reported, Viking, (Ringwood), 1996.

See also
 1976 VFL season
 Peter Crimmins

VFL/AFL Grand Finals
Grand
Hawthorn Football Club
North Melbourne Football Club